Lyces andosa is a moth of the family Notodontidae first described by Herbert Druce in 1911. It is found on the Pacific slope of north-western Colombia.

External links
Species page at Tree of Life Web Project

Notodontidae of South America
Moths described in 1911